Giorgi Papava (born 16 February 1993) is a Georgian football player. He is a midfielder and plays for FC AGMK and the Georgia national football team. He is 186 cm tall and weighs 71 kg.

Honours
Dinamo Tbilisi
Georgian League: 2012–13; 2013–14
Georgian Cup: 2013 ; 2014
Georgian Super Cup: 2014

External links
 

1993 births
Living people
Footballers from Georgia (country)
Georgia (country) international footballers
Georgia (country) under-21 international footballers
Expatriate footballers from Georgia (country)
Association football goalkeepers
Cypriot First Division players
FC Dinamo Tbilisi players
Nea Salamis Famagusta FC players
FC Dila Gori players
Expatriate footballers in Cyprus
FC Metalurgi Rustavi players
Uzbekistan Super League players